Zervant is an Espoo, Finland-based company that offers cloud-based invoicing software for small businesses. Its core markets are Finland, Sweden, France, Germany and the UK. In 2016, when its software had 100,000 users, it was named the most promising fintech startup in the Nordics by Deloitte Digital and True Global Ventures.

History 
Zervan launched in 2010. It was founded by Mattias Hansson and Tuukka Koskinen. In 2016 it closed a €4 million funding round, led by technology investment firm Northzone. In the same year, the company signed a multi-million Euro partnership with ING Belgium, providing the bank with the rights to offer the software to its own business clients. In January 2018 it raised an additional €6 million round, led by Tesi, along with NFT Ventures, Northzone and Conor Venture Partners.

References

External links 
 

Software companies of Finland